Seven ships of the Royal Navy have been named HMS Monmouth. Monmouth was the name of a castle and is now the name of a town in Wales; the name also recognises James Scott, 1st Duke of Monmouth, the "Black Duke".

  was an 8-gun yacht launched in 1666 and sold in 1698.
  was a 66-gun third rate launched in 1667.  She was rebuilt in 1700 and 1742, and was broken up in 1767.
  was a 64-gun third rate launched in 1772.  She became a prison ship and named HMS Captivity in 1796, and was broken up in 1818.
  was a 64-gun third rate, originally the Indiaman Belmont. She was purchased on the stocks and launched in 1796. She became a sheer hulk in 1815 and was broken up in 1834.
She became a chapel hulk in 1859, was renamed HMS Monmouth in 1868, and sold in 1902.
  was a  armoured cruiser launched in 1901 and sunk at the Battle of Coronel in 1914.
  is a Type 23 frigate launched in 1991 and decommissioned in 2021.

Battle honours
Ships named Monmouth have earned the following battle honours:

Sole Bay 1672
Texel 1673
Barfleur 1692
Vigo 1702
Gibraltar 1704
Velez Malaga 1704
Marbella 1705
Finisterre 1747
Ushant 1747
Foudroyant 1758
Belle Isle 1761
Sadras 1782
Providien 1782
Negapatam 1782
Trincomalee 1782
Camperdown 1797
Egypt 1801

References

Royal Navy ship names